William Jacob Fromm (born July 30, 1998) is an American football quarterback for the Washington Commanders of the National Football League (NFL). He played college football at Georgia and was drafted by the Buffalo Bills in the fifth round of the 2020 NFL Draft. He started two games with the New York Giants in 2021.

Early years
Fromm was born in Warner Robins, Georgia, on July 30, 1998. In his early years, Fromm played baseball with his local Warner Robins team, which came within two games of the 2011 Little League World Series championship game. During the LLWS, Fromm at times would play in front of crowds larger than 25,000. He was one of the best players in the tournament while hitting three home runs and driving in eight runs. He also struck out 11 batters as a pitcher.

Fromm later attended Houston County High School in Warner Robins. During his career he had 12,745 passing yards and 116 touchdowns. Fromm was rated as a five-star recruit by Rivals.com and Scout.com. He originally committed to the University of Alabama to play college football but changed his commitment to the University of Georgia. Fromm's senior year was discussed in the web-series QB1: Beyond the Lights, created by Peter Berg. He was one of the three quarterbacks documented in the series, with the other two being Ohio State commit Tate Martell and Tayvon Bowers who committed to Wake Forest.

College career
Fromm entered his true freshman year at Georgia in 2017 as the backup to Jacob Eason. In the first game of the season, after Eason suffered an injury, Fromm replaced him and completed 10 of 15 passes for 143 yards and a touchdown against Appalachian State. Fromm was then named the starter for the team's next game against Notre Dame. Fromm threw for 141 yards and a touchdown. In the next game, the Bulldogs defeated Samford with a 42–14 win. After a win against Vanderbilt, Fromm played his best game against Missouri. He threw for 326 yards and completed 18 of 26 passes. This performance led the Bulldogs to be the third-ranked team in the nation. After a 42–7 win vs Florida, the Bulldogs became No. 1 after Penn State lost. Fromm and the Bulldogs would eventually go on to win the 2017 SEC Championship against Auburn. He was named SEC co-newcomer of the year by the Associated Press. He led Georgia to a 54–48 victory over Oklahoma in double overtime in the Rose Bowl on January 1, 2018, to earn them a spot in the CFP final against Alabama. Fromm and the Bulldogs went on to lose to Alabama in the College Football National Championship, 23–26. Fromm threw for 232 yards, a touchdown and two interceptions, while completing 16 of 32 passes.

In the 2018 season, Fromm helped lead Georgia to an 11–3 record, albeit with losses to Alabama in the SEC Championship and Texas in the Sugar Bowl. He passed for 2,749 passing yards, 30 touchdowns, and six interceptions.

In the 2019 season, Fromm once again led Georgia to the SEC Championship, where they lost to LSU. He finished his college career with a victory over Baylor in the Sugar Bowl.

On January 8, 2020, Fromm announced his intention to skip his senior season at Georgia; he had already declared for the 2020 NFL Draft.

Professional career

Buffalo Bills
The Buffalo Bills drafted Fromm in the fifth round with the 167th overall pick of the 2020 NFL Draft.

Fromm signed a four-year, $3.771 million contract, including a $302,960 signing bonus, with the Bills on May 7, 2020.

On August 31, 2021, Fromm was released from the Bills and re-signed to the practice squad the next day.

New York Giants
 
On November 30, 2021, Fromm was signed by the New York Giants from the Bills practice squad. This was after an injury to starting quarterback Daniel Jones. He replaced interim starter Mike Glennon in the fourth quarter against the Dallas Cowboys on December 19. Fromm got his first career start in Week 16 game against the Philadelphia Eagles, throwing for 25 yards in 17 attempts with one interception. He finished the season with 27 completions for 210 yards, a touchdown, and three interceptions. On March 16, 2022, Fromm was non-tendered by the Giants, making him a free agent.

Washington Commanders
Fromm signed with the Washington Commanders' practice squad on October 18, 2022. He signed a reserve/future contract on January 9, 2023.

Personal life
Fromm is a Christian. Fromm has said, "I want to represent Christ the best I can. I hope I can reach and influence as many people as possible."

His nickname is "Jake Fromm State Farm" in reference to an advertising campaign from State Farm, which later paid him to represent them during coverage of Super Bowl LV. The nickname started as a running joke from high school.

On June 4, 2020, Fromm publicly apologized after screenshots emerged of a text conversation from 2019 in which a friend wrote, "But no guns are good. They need to let me get suppressors", before Fromm added, "Just make them very expensive so only elite white people can get them haha." He further wrote that he was not an "elite white person".

References

External links

  Sports-Reference (college)
 Washington Commanders bio
Georgia Bulldogs bio

Living people
1998 births
People from Warner Robins, Georgia
Players of American football from Georgia (U.S. state)
American football quarterbacks
Georgia Bulldogs football players
Buffalo Bills players
New York Giants players
Washington Commanders players